Salah Nasr (8 October 1920 – 5 March 1982) served as head of the Egyptian General Intelligence Directorate from 1957 to 1967. He retired citing health reasons following Egypt's defeat in the 1967 Six-Day War. He was succeeded by Amin Howeidi in the post. Nasr was subsequently imprisoned until being granted release by Anwar Sadat in February 1974.

In 1976, Nasr was again imprisoned after being accused by journalist Mustapha Amin of torture after an arrest 11 years prior.

References

External links

1920 births
1982 deaths
Directors of the General Intelligence Directorate (Egypt)
Egyptian spies
Egyptian prisoners and detainees